Pachal (also Romanized as Pāchāl; also known as Pāchāl-e Cherāgh Khān and Pāchāl-e Soflá) is a village in Nurabad Rural District, in the Central District of Delfan County, Lorestan Province, Iran. At the 2006 census, its population was 14, in 4 families.

References 

Towns and villages in Delfan County